Strangers Only is the second studio album by American heavy metal band My Ticket Home. It was released on September 3, 2013, through Rise Records. The album's musical style is a drastic departure from the post-hardcore and metalcore sound of the band's previous releases, instead showcasing a nu metal sound with only some elements of metalcore. It was the band's final album with Rise Records, after the band left the label and would later sign with Spinefarm Records.

Track listing

Personnel
My Ticket Home
 Nick Giumenti – unclean vocals, bass; clean vocals on tracks 3 and 7
 Marshal Giumenti – drums, backing vocals
 Matt Gallucci – guitar, backing vocals
 Derek Blevins – guitar; clean vocals on tracks 3, 5, 6, 7, 8

Production
 Will Putney – producer, engineering, mastering, mixing
 Randy Leboeuf – producer, engineering, mastering, mixing

References

2013 albums
My Ticket Home albums
Rise Records albums
Albums produced by Will Putney